Holmwood railway station serves the villages of Beare Green and South Holmwood in Surrey, England, on the Sutton and Mole Valley Lines between  and Horsham,  from London Waterloo.

Services
All services at Holmwood are operated by Southern using Class 377 EMUs.

The typical off-peak service in trains per hour is:
 1 tph to London Victoria via Sutton
 1 tph to 

During the peak hours, the service is increased to 2 tph. There is no service on Saturday evenings (after approximately 18:30) or on Sundays.

Facilities

Station Facilities 
The station is unstaffed and has no ticket office although there is a self-service ticket machine on the London bound platform for ticket purchases. Both platforms have departure boards, shelters and modern help points. There are no car parking facilities at the station although there is a small bicycle storage facility at the station.

The Signal Box 
The original 1877 signal box remains on the London bound platform although is now disused. The signal box is Grade II listed.

History 
The station opened in 1867 in what was the far north of the civil parish of Capel along the London, Brighton, and South Coast Railway line to Portsmouth.  Why it was called Holmwood is mysterious, however Beare Green was a smaller settlement than the Holmwood area which was expanding with building at the time.

Holmwood for many years had until a revised timetable of 10 July 1967 two hourly services during the day in each direction:
to and from Waterloo and Horsham
to and from London Bridge (via Sutton and Tulse Hill) and Horsham.

In respect of the first route where on time the journey was completed in less than 55 minutes: no slack, allowing for lengthy boarding assuming identical track speed, was built into the timetables.  Of relevance to Bognor Regis, a once an hour non-stop express Victoria service went through the station from the coastal resort.
	
Further, Holmwood was a terminus for various additional trains to and from Waterloo.

	 	
Prior to 1963 the use of Holmwood as a terminus was implemented for much of the day. For example, a serious accident at Motspur Park on 6 Nov 1947 involved the 16:45 Southern Railway train from Holmwood to Waterloo. This service was withdrawn in 1963, the later 17:45 being the last of a series of hourly trains from Holmwood to Waterloo to be retained in the 1963 timetable. The accident in 1947 resulted from incorrect manual fog signalling when the driver of the Holmwood train was given permission to enter the junction at Motspur Park before the down Chessington train had cleared the junction, and before the signals and points were changed by the signal box. This is one of the few references one can find to the important role that Holmwood station played in the Sutton and Mole Valley Lines to Waterloo service initiated in the early 20th century by the Southern Railway. Before nationalisation in the 1940s, the Southern Railway built, owned its trains, running from today's two London termini as well as Waterloo following the formation of the Big Four.

Thus the earlier timetables for services on the line from London Victoria to Horsham in 1905 and 1917 show that services to London Waterloo and London Bridge adhering to the Victorian service pattern from Holmwood, Ockley and Warnham being to London Victoria only.

Some features of the unusual service pattern endure include its last evening weekday rush hour service from London Victoria at 7:20pm (apart from the 11:26pm weekday service added to the timetable in December 2004 following several years of pressure from a local campaigner) traceable to the Victorian/Edwardian origins.

From at least Victorian times (or quite probably from the opening of the line in 1867) until the middle of the 20th century the line also had four services to and from London Victoria in each direction on a Sunday compared to no Sunday service at all in current times. There were two services in each direction in the early morning and two more in the late afternoon/early evening (a total of eight trains in all on the Dorking to Horsham section of line during the day) making Sunday outings to the Capital and elsewhere possible in this still largely pre-motor car era.  However it is not clear from easily available records precisely when Holmwood and the neighbouring two stations of Ockley and Warnham lost their Sunday railway services.

References

External links 

Railway stations in Surrey
Former London, Brighton and South Coast Railway stations
Railway stations in Great Britain opened in 1867
Railway stations served by Govia Thameslink Railway